The Flame of Hercules: The Story of a Fugitive Galley Slave is a 1955 novel by Richard Llewellyn. It tells the story of a young captive prince from Gaul, Garvan, and how his travails augur that of young Christianity. He falls in love with the daughter of a prominent citizen of Herculaneum, a Vestal. They become a part of a conflict between the devotees of Christ and of Diana.

References

1955 British novels
Novels by Richard Llewellyn
Michael Joseph books